Antonio Šančić and Artem Sitak were the defending champions but only Sitak chose to defend his title, partnering Sem Verbeek. Sitak lost in the first round to Dan Added and Albano Olivetti.

Added and Olivetti won the title after defeating Romain Arneodo and Tristan-Samuel Weissborn 6–3, 3–6, [12–10] in the final.

Seeds

Draw

References

External links
 Main draw

Saint-Tropez Open - Doubles